Kim Nung-o (born in the late 1960s) is a North Korean politician. He is the chairman of the Workers' Party of Korea (WPK) Party Committee of Pyongyang. Kim is also a full member of the Central Committee of the WPK and an alternate member of its Politburo.

Career
Kim Nung-o was born in the late 1960s. He was educated at Kim Il-sung University.

Kim has worked at various departments of the Central Committee of the Workers' Party of Korea (WPK), being a vice director of the Finance and Accounting Department in 2013. He was first mentioned by North Korean media on 1 November 2014 when he was accompanying Kim Jong-un on a guidance tour of Pyongyang International Airport. Kim Nung-o became the chief secretary of the Party Committee of North Pyongan Province in December 2015, replacing Ri Man-gon. He subsequently become the chairman of the Party Committee. He now serves as the chairman of the Party Committee of the capital Pyongyang.

Kim became a full member of the Central Committee and an alternate member of the Politburo of the WPK at the 7th Congress of the WPK in May 2016. In January 2019, Kim gave a speech at a mass rally at Kim Il-sung Square in Pyongyang, praising Kim Jong-un's New Year Address and urging inhabitants of the city to increase efforts to attain a self-reliant socialist economy.

See also

 Politics of North Korea

References

|-

Living people
1960s births
Workers' Party of Korea politicians
Year of birth missing (living people)
Place of birth missing (living people)
Pyongyang